Amphilochus, Amphilochos or Amphílokhos may refer to:

Astronomy 
 5244 Amphilochos, Jovian asteroid

Biology  
 Amphilochus (crustacean), a genus of amphipods

Greek mythology 
 Amphilochus, son of Amphiaraus, brother of Alcmaeon
 Amphilochus, son of Alcmaeon
 Amphilochus, husband of Alcinoe

See also 
 Amphilochius (disambiguation)